Elijah Danilo Moore (born March 27, 2000) is an American football wide receiver for the New York Jets of the National Football League (NFL).  He played college football at Ole Miss and was drafted by the Jets in the second round of the 2021 NFL Draft.

Early life and high school career
Moore grew up in Fort Lauderdale, Florida and attended St. Thomas Aquinas High School. As a senior, Moore caught 28 passes for 407 yards and five touchdowns and was named an Under Armour All-American. He was rated a four-star recruit and originally committed to play college football at Georgia over 33 other scholarship offers. Moore changed his commitment to Ole Miss in December of his senior year.

College career
As a true freshman, Moore caught 36 passes for 398 yards and two touchdowns. As a sophomore, he led the Rebels with 67 receptions, 850 receiving yards and six touchdown catches. In the 2019 Egg Bowl against Mississippi State, Moore drew a 15-yard unsportsmanlike conduct penalty for pretending to be a dog urinating in the end zone following the touchdown. As a result, the extra point attempt went from being a 20-yard attempt to a 35-yard attempt, which was missed as Ole Miss lost 21–20. The loss led Ole Miss to fire head coach Matt Luke.

Moore entered his junior season on the watchlist for the Biletnikoff Award. In the season opener against Florida, Moore caught ten passes for 227 yards, the second most in a game in school history. He set a new school record for receiving yards in a game with 238 while also tying the Ole Miss game records for receptions with 14 and touchdown catches with three on October 31, 2020, in a 54–21 win over Vanderbilt. Moore finished the season with a school-record 86 receptions for 1,193 yards and eight touchdowns in eight games played before opting out before the Rebels' final regular season game in order to begin preparing for the 2021 NFL Draft. Moore was named first-team All-SEC and was a consensus first-team All-America selection as well a finalist for the Biletnikoff Award.

Collegiate statistics

Professional career

Moore was selected by the New York Jets in the second round (34th overall) of the 2021 NFL Draft. On July 21, 2021, Moore signed his four-year rookie contract with the Jets, worth $8.94 million.

Moore entered his rookie season as a starting wide receiver. He scored his first career touchdown in a breakout game in Week 9 against the Indianapolis Colts, recording seven catches for 84 yards and two touchdowns. In Week 11, he had eight catches for 141 yards and a touchdown. He suffered a quad injury in Week 13 and was placed on injured reserve on December 11, 2021. He finished his rookie season with 43 receptions for 538 receiving yards and five receiving touchdowns and one rushing touchdown.

In the 2022 season, Moore finished with 37 receptions for 446 receiving yards and one receiving touchdown in 16 games.

NFL career statistics

Regular season

References

External links

New York Jets bio
Ole Miss Rebels bio

2000 births
Living people
American football wide receivers
Ole Miss Rebels football players
Players of American football from Fort Lauderdale, Florida
Moore, Elijah
All-American college football players
New York Jets players